The R. C. Harris Water Treatment Plant in Toronto, Ontario, Canada, is both a crucial piece of infrastructure and an architecturally acclaimed historic building named after the longtime commissioner of Toronto's public works Roland Caldwell Harris. The plant's architect was Thomas C. Pomphrey with engineers H.G. Acres and William Gore. It is located in the east of the city at the eastern end of Queen Street and at the foot of Victoria Park Avenue along the shore of Lake Ontario in the Beaches neighbourhood in the former city of Scarborough.

Roland Caldwell Harris

Harris was born in Lansing on May 26, 1875 in what is now North York, Ontario, but grew up in Toronto. Harris was Public Works Commissioner from 1912 to 1945 and involved in projects like:

 Prince Edward Viaduct opened in 1918 and which included his idea to add a deck under the bridge allowed for the Bloor Danforth line to be built decades later.
 Mount Pleasant bridge as part of the extension of Mount Pleasant Road north to Lawrence Avenue East in 1934.
 expansion of the streetcar network of the Toronto Civic Railways from 1912 to 1915.
 Waterfront Railway Viaduct built from 1925 to 1934 to bring rail lines into Union Station.
 extension of University Avenue south of Queen Street West to Front Street in 1931.

Harris died on September 3, 1945. His son Lieutenant Colonel Roland Allen Harris was a member of the Queen's Own Rifles. Harris is buried in family plot at St. John's Norway Cemetery.

Site history

Pre-1932 history
The land was once owned by Peter Patterson and George Monro. Prior to the construction of a water treatment plant, the area was the site of Victoria Park, a waterfront amusement park that operated from 1878 until 1906. It closed the same year as rival Munro Park ceased operations. The amusement park was initially served by ferry from York Street (same docks serving Toronto Islands) until 1895 when streetcar service commenced.

After the park closed in 1906, Victoria Park Forest School opened and used the site until 1932.

Water treatment plant

With an early 20th-century Toronto plagued with water shortages and unclean drinking water, public health advocates such as George Nasmith and Toronto's Medical Officer of Health, Charles Hastings, campaigned for a modern water purification system.

Construction for a water treatment plant began on the site in 1932 and the building became operational on November 1, 1941. The building, unlike most modern engineering structures, was also created to make an architectural statement. Fashioned in the Art Deco style, the cathedral-like structure remains one of Toronto's most admired buildings. It is, however, little known to outsiders. The interiors are just as opulent with marble entryways and vast halls filled with pools of water and filtration equipment. The plant has thus earned the nickname The Palace of Purification.

In 1992, the R. C. Harris Water Treatment Plant was named a national historic civil engineering site by the Canadian Society for Civil Engineering. It was designated under the Ontario Heritage Act in 1998.  The plant appeared on a stamp issued by Canada Post in 2011, in a series showcasing five notable Art Deco buildings in Canada.

Use

Despite its age, the plant is still fully functional, providing approximately 30% of Toronto's water supply. Water is also chlorinated in the plant and then pumped to various reservoirs throughout the City of Toronto and York Region.

Access
The facility grounds have been made available to the public. Despite some concerns of vulnerability to an attack on the water supply since the September 11 attacks, the grounds have remained open to the public, but security has been increased. In the summer of 2007, construction began on the installation of an underground Residual Management Facility allowing processed waste to be removed before discharging into the lake. This construction has since been completed.

In popular culture
The R. C. Harris Water Treatment Plant has been used in dozens of films and television series as a prison, clinic, or headquarters.

The building of the plant is vividly recounted in Michael Ondaatje's In the Skin of a Lion.
The headquarters of "The Man" in the 2002 comedy Undercover Brother.
A prison in the 1998 comedy Half Baked.
An asylum in the 1995 horror film In the Mouth of Madness.
"The Centre," a nefarious think tank in the television series The Pretender.
Base of operations for Genomex, an antagonistic corporation in the television series Mutant X.
The Royal Canadian Institute for the Mentally Insane (next door to Elsinore Brewery) in the 1983 film Strange Brew.
The Henry Ford Centre for the Criminally Insane, as seen in Robocop: The Series.
The Langstaff Maximum Security Prison, as seen in Flashpoint in the episode Just a Man.
The Mellonville Maximum Security Prison, as seen in an SCTV episode (1982).
A prison in the Psi Factor: Chronicles of the Paranormal episode "Solitary Confinement."
"Lake District Federal Prison" in Between in the episode School's Out.
A prison building in the Conviction episode "A Different Kind of Death."
A prison in the closing scenes of The Big Heist, when Donald Sutherland's character enters to serve a 20-year sentence.
"Ekart County Jail" in the 2015 movie Regression.
"U.N. Penitentiary Chesapeake Conservancy Zone" in the 2020 season of The Expanse.
A Children’s Hospital in Guillermo Del Toro’s 1997 film Mimic.
The office of Richard Jenkins' character, Ezra Grindle, a factory executive with a dark past, in Guillermo Del Toro’s Nightmare Alley.
Womens Prison in Mayor of Kingstown

References

External links

Art Deco architecture in Canada
Municipal buildings in Toronto
Buildings and structures in Scarborough, Toronto
Water treatment facilities